Andrew Wall (born 23 June 1984), an Australian politician, was a member of the Australian Capital Territory Legislative Assembly representing the electorate of Brindabella for the Liberal Party from 2012 until 2020.

Career
Wall was born in Canberra, raised in Wanniassa, and attended Marist College. He spent several years in Queanbeyan before returning to Canberra.

Prior to his election, Wall worked in the construction industry, managing a patio business.

See also

References

1984 births
Living people
Members of the Australian Capital Territory Legislative Assembly
Liberal Party of Australia members of the Australian Capital Territory Legislative Assembly
21st-century Australian politicians